Nodes of Yesod is a video game developed and published by Odin Computer Graphics in 1985. The game is similar in style to Underwurlde by Ultimate Play the Game, which was released a year earlier, and Metroid which was released a year later, in 1986.

The game was released for the Amstrad CPC, Commodore 64, Elan Enterprise 64 and 128 and ZX Spectrum platforms. Versions were also planned for the BBC Micro and MSX platforms but these were cancelled.

On the ZX Spectrum, the game came in separate 48K and 128K versions. The latter had improved title-screen music, in-game music and additional synthesised speech.

A sequel, The Arc of Yesod, was also published the same year.

A "25th Anniversary Edition" was released in 2010 for the iPhone and iOS (Apple) devices. This version included a "classic mode" (very similar to the original ZX Spectrum version) and an "enhanced mode", which featured new colour graphics, help system, map system, save/resume game feature and remixed music.

Plot
Charlemagne "Charlie" Fotheringham-Grunes, the apprentice saviour of the universe, has been asked to find the source of mysterious signals from the moon which turn out to be a black monolith (a homage to the film 2001: A Space Odyssey). Charlie promptly volunteers for the task of going to the moon and finding the monolith.

Gameplay
Nodes of Yesod is a flick-screen platform game. The player controls Charlie Fotheringham-Grunes, who is dressed like an astronaut. Starting on the moon's surface, Charlie must venture into the caverns below and retrieve eight alchiems (which look a little like coloured crystals) in order to find the monolith.

Charlie can perform a rolling jump in order to make his way around the caverns and can jump quite high, doubtless thanks to the moon's low gravity. However, falling from great heights is still dangerous and will cause him to lose a life.

Before venturing into the caverns, Charlie needs to search for a lunar mole on the moon's surface. Once he has collected one of these creatures, he can release it in the caverns when required and it will chew-through any walls it can, revealing new areas of the maze.

Once Charlie has collected an alchiem, it appears on his status panel at the bottom of the screen. Unfortunately, there are "muggers" in the caverns (who look like red astronauts with jet packs). If one of these touches Charlie they will steal alchiems meaning Charlie will have to find them again.

There are two kinds of monster in Nodes of Yesod - harmful and non-harmful. The harmful creatures float around the caverns and will sap Charlie's strength if touched. The non-harmful creatures won't do Charlie any damage but will cause him to bounce around (similarly to the creatures in Underwurlde) and are thus a nuisance.

Trivia
The ZX Spectrum version was voted the 30th best game of all time in a special issue of Your Sinclair magazine in 2004.
The central character's double-barrelled surname is taken from the surnames of two of the artists - Stuart Fotheringham and Colin Grunes.
Stuart Fotheringham, one of the artists and game designers on Nodes of Yesod, claims that an earlier finished version of the map and screen layouts was created but was lost in a Microdrive crash and the maps and screens had to be recreated from scratch. He claims that the second, published, version was slightly inferior to the lost original.
In Poland, this game was pirated under the title Charlie na księżycu (meaning Charlie on the moon).

References

External links
 Crash review of the game
 Detailed technical look at the game
 Complete map of the game

1985 video games
ZX Spectrum games
Amstrad CPC games
Commodore 64 games
Cancelled BBC Micro and Acorn Electron games
IOS games
Science fiction video games
Video games developed in the United Kingdom
Video games scored by Fred Gray